Bigfoot Family is a 2020 computer-animated comedy film directed by Ben Stassen and Jeremy Degruson. It is the sequel to the 2017 film The Son of Bigfoot. The film was also released as Bigfoot Superstar.

Plot

Two months after convincing his father Bigfoot to return home, Adam becomes overwhelmed with the attention his father's newfound fame has brought the family. He is also struggling to confess his feelings to his crush Emma.

Bigfoot wants to use his fame for a good cause and decides that protecting a large wildlife reserve from a dodgy oil company in Alaska is the perfect opportunity. Adam helps his father by uploading a promotional video to social media. Swathes of protestors arrive to support Bigfoot, who mysteriously disappears one night. Adam and his mother Shelly journey to find and rescue him along with their animal friends.

Arriving in Alaska, Adam and Shelly meet with the protestor who last saw Bigfoot, Arlo Woodstock. Shelly follows Arlo to the last location he saw Bigfoot while Adam and his animal friends are ambushed by workers from the oil company. He escapes and encounters a wolf whom he strikes a deal with. The wolf guides him to where the oil company is working before departing. Adam finds out that Arlo actually works for the company run by Connor Mandrake and has taken Shelly. Adam evades capture from him.

Adam infiltrates the company grounds. Connor is preparing to destroy the valley using a bomb, so that he can excavate the present oil easier. After freeing Shelly as well as his father who was also kidnapped by the company, Adam escapes the grounds with them. Turning back, they defuse the bomb. Connor confronts them and Adam records him. Connor later attempts to escape, but is interrupted by a moose and throw into a puddle of oil alongside Arlo.

Adam later meets with Emma and she reveals that he accidentally sent a video exposing his feelings to her. He asks Emma out and she accepts. Emma kisses Adam while his eavesdropping family congratulates him.

The movie ends as Trapper asks for another pancake and it goes on his face.

Voice cast
 Jules Wojciechowski as Adam, Bigfoot's son (voiced by Pappy Faulkner in the previous film)
 Roger Craig Smith as Dr. Jim "Bigfoot" Harrison, Adam's father who had genetically mutated into the mythical creature of Bigfoot (voiced by Chris Parson in the previous film)
 Grant George as Connor Mandrake, a greedy oil tycoon who is determined to destroy Rocky Valley
 David Lodge as Arlo Woodstock, one of the environmental protesters Bigfoot meets in Alaska who is later revealed to be Connor Mandrake's second-in-command
 Shyloh Oostwald as Emma, Adam's friend and love interest
 Lindsey Alena as Shelly, Adam's mother and Bigfoot's wife (voiced by Marieve Herington in the previous film)
 Sandy Fox as Tina, a squirrel
 Joe Ochman as Trapper, a raccoon
 Joe J. Thomas as Steve, a woodpecker
 Laila Berzins as Weecha, a raccoon and Trapper's wife
 Michael Sorich as Wilbur, the intimidating yet adorable grizzly bear
 Joey Camen as Principal Jones, the principal of Adams's school
 Chris Niosi, Della Saba and Jessica Gee-George as students at Adam's school
 Dino Andrade as a drone operator for Xtract
 Kyle Hebert as an Xtract guard
 James Fredrick as an Xtract guard
 Jeff Rector as the news anchor
 Cyndia Scott as Doris, a feisty pilot who takes Bigfoot to Alaska
 George Babbit as Cy Wheeler, Becky's agent who arranges cheaply-made merchandise for Bigfoot

Production  
Production for  Bigfoot Family began shortly before the release of nWave's seventh animated feature film, The Queen's Corgi. The film follows The Son of Bigfoot, which came out in theaters in 2018. The animation studio teased the production of the movie at the 2020 Paris Images Digital Summit.

Music  
After collaborating with nWave Pictures on the soundtrack of The Son of Bigfoot, Belgian music band Puggy agreed to score the soundtrack of Bigfoot Family.

Release
In June 2020, Bigfoot Family premiered at the Annecy International Animated Film Festival. At the festival, it was nominated for Best Animated Feature Film. Bigfoot Family premiered on Netflix on February 26, 2021. It was the #1 movie on Netflix in the US, Canada, Australia, New Zealand, and the UK on its opening weekend, and remained the #1 movie in the US for six days in a row.

Controversy 
In March 2021, the movie was targeted by the Canadian Energy Centre, an agency created and funded by the government of Alberta to promote the oil industry and defend it from critics including environmentalists. The Canadian Energy Centre, also called the "energy war room," published a website that accused the movie and its American distributor, Netflix, of "brainwashing" children with misinformation. The website, which was titled Support Canadian Energy, included a petition.

References

External links

Support Canadian Energy published by the Canadian Energy Centre

2020 films
2020 computer-animated films
2020 3D films
Belgian animated films
2020s French-language films
2020s French animated films
Bigfoot films
2020 comedy-drama films
Films set in Portland, Oregon
Films set in 2016
Films set in Alaska
2020s French films
Animated films about children
Animated films about families